

Administrative and municipal divisions

 urban okrug - also known as "municipal formation"

References

Sverdlovsk Oblast
Sverdlovsk Oblast